John T. McDonald III is the Assembly member for the 108th District of the New York State Assembly. He is a Democrat. The district includes all of Cohoes and Rensselaer, and parts of Albany and Troy.

Life and career
McDonald was born and raised in Cohoes, New York where he would later serve as Mayor from 1999 to 2012. In 1985, he graduated from the Albany College of Pharmacy and went on to open Marra's Pharmacy which is located in Cohoes, where he and his family still reside today.

Formerly, McDonald served as the President of the New York Conference of Mayors.

New York Assembly
In 2012, McDonald opted to run for a newly created seat in the New York Assembly. In the Democratic primary, he defeated Albany City Council President Carolyn McLaughlin 55% to 45% to take the nomination. He would easily win the general election with 76% of the vote. In 2014 he was easily re-elected with 73% of the vote.

In the Assembly, McDonald serves as the Chairman of the Subcommittee on Effective Treatment.

References

External links
New York State Assemblyman John T. McDonald III official site

Living people
1962 births
Mayors of places in New York (state)
Democratic Party members of the New York State Assembly
American pharmacists
People from Cohoes, New York
21st-century American politicians